Chronica principum Poloniae  is a historiographical work written in Silesia, ca, 1382–1386. Its authorship is ascribed to Canon  (1328–1389). 

The original chronicle (or the "first part") describes the history of the Piast dynasty and the Polish state from the earliest times to the mid 1380s. The work was later extended to cover the periods up to the 16th century.

Book title 

The work was written in the Latin as Chronica principum Poloniae, but is known also by its Polish-translated title Kronika książąt polskich, ("Chronicle of the Princes of Poland" or "Chronicle of Polish Dukes")

Date and authorship 

 
The writing was started the 1382 or thereafter and was completed by 1386.

This conjecture was partly based on textual evidence, but also on the observation that the author must have been a steadfast germanophile to present so favorable a picture of Queen Richeza, who was despised by the Poles.

Continuation 
The original work encompassed all the years up to 1384, but this was later expanded with a continuation which covers the history up to the year 1520.

Content 
The chronicle is described as the "most important historiographic work of the Silesian Middle Ages". It delves into the origins of the Bohemian and Polish states, since the Post-Diluvian period. It records the history of the Piast dynasty and its branches from "time memorial" onwards to Louis's dukeship, into  the 1380s or 1390s. The work by design closely intertwined the history of Silesia with the history of other Polish provinces. It may have had the intention of bolstering the position of Louis's claim to the Polish throne.

Sources 
Like Wincenty's Chronica  compiled earlier, it used Gallus Anonymus's Gesta as its source. 

However, perhaps a more extensive source was the Chronicon Polono-Silesiacum ("Polish-Silesian Chronicle"), completed c. 1285. A copy of it had been purchased by the works patron Louis, and it served as source to the period from the beginning in to the year 1277.

Gallus was utilized as a source for a shorter span of history, from the Polish kingship being taken over from Pompilius (Popiel) by the Piasts (10th century?), until and not including the Siege of Głogów (1109), where Emperor Henry IV (Henry V of Germany)'s invasion of Poland, provoked by Bolesław III Wrymouth.

One commentator more broadly stated that the first part, up to year 1285, was derived from these two earlier sources ("Silesian-Polish Chronicle" [sic.] and Gallus) while the second part from 1285 onwards, can be credited as Peter's original composition.

Explanatory notes

References 
Citations

Post-diluvian

Bibliography

 

 

  

  

1380s books
14th-century manuscripts
History of Silesia
Polish chronicles
14th-century Latin books
14th-century history books